Stouffer is an Americanized spelling of the German surname Stauffer, occupational name for a maker or seller of beakers or mugs.

Stouffer may refer to:

 Abraham Stouffer, founder of Stouffville, Ontario
 Abraham E. Stouffer (1875–1936), founder of Stouffer's
 Bill Stouffer, American farmer and small business owner
 Ellis Stouffer (1884–1965), American mathematician
 Hannah Stouffer, American artist
 Kelly Stouffer, former NFL Quarterback
  Marty Stouffer, narrator and producer of the animal documentary show Wild America
 Nancy Stouffer, also known as N. K. Stouffer, American children's book author
 Samuel A. Stouffer, American sociologist
 Vernon Stouffer (1901–1972), founder of Stouffer's
  Stouffer, a previous pseudonym of Scottish musician Calvin Harris
Stouffer the Cat, puppet of British comedian Harry Hill

See also
Stouffer's